Route 210 is a provincial highway located in the Estrie region of Quebec. The  highway runs from west to east from the Eaton area of Cookshire-Eaton at the junction of Route 108 to Chartierville at the junction of Route 257, via the village of Sawyerville.

Approximately  of the easternmost section of Route 210 is unpaved, other than the final  approaching the terminus at Route 257.

Municipalities along Route 210
 Cookshire-Eaton
 Newport
 Chartierville

Major intersections

See also
 List of Quebec provincial highways

References

External links 
 Official Transport Quebec Road Map
 Route 210 on Google Maps

210